Giannis Katsikis (born 24 May 1979) is a Greek former professional footballer.

References
Myplayer

1979 births
Living people
Thrasyvoulos F.C. players
A.P.O. Akratitos Ano Liosia players
Kallithea F.C. players
Apollon Smyrnis F.C. players
Olympiacos Volos F.C. players
Ionikos F.C. players
Enosi Panaspropyrgiakou Doxas players
Greek footballers
Association football forwards